is a railway station on the privately operated Chōshi Electric Railway Line in Chōshi, Chiba, Japan.

Lines

Station layout
The station is staffed during the daytime, and consists of one side platform serving a single track. Nure senbei (moist senbei rice crackers) are made and sold inside the large Portuguese-style station building.

Former Choshi Electric Railway DeHa 501 EMU car was sectioned and grounded in front of the station together with former Sagami Railway 2000 series EMU car MoNi 2022. These were used as shop and restaurant facilities until they were cut up on-site in July 2012 due to their increasingly poor structural condition.

History

The railway closed in November 1917, but was reopened on 5 July 1923 as the Chōshi Railway. The original station was located 400 m south of the location of the present-day Inuboh Station. On 21 June 1935, a new temporary station opened at the present-day station of Inuboh Station, named . This became a full-time station from 14 August 1935. With the opening of Tōdaimae Station, passenger usage of the original Inuboh Station dropped from an average of 30 passengers daily in 1930 to an average of just 13 passengers daily. The original Inuboh Station closed from 15 November 1941, from which date Tōdaimae Station was renamed Inuboh. The original station structure included a roof extending over the platform, but this was damaged by a typhoon in September 1948, and not replaced. A new Portuguese-style station building was completed in December 1990 with a large forecourt area for special events.

Passenger statistics
In fiscal 2010, the station was used by an average of 158 passengers daily (boarding passengers only). The passenger figures for previous years are as shown below.

Surrounding area

 Inubōsaki Lighthouse
 
 Inubosaki Marine Park

Inubōsaki Onsen
Since 1996, a number of hotels in the vicinity started boring for onsen hot springs.

 
  (closed 20 April 2012)

See also
 List of railway stations in Japan

References

External links

 Choshi Electric Railway station information 

Stations of Chōshi Electric Railway Line
Railway stations in Chiba Prefecture
Railway stations in Japan opened in 1913